Showa Maru may refer to:
Japanese auxiliary minesweeper Showa Maru No. 7, World War II-era Japanese auxiliary minesweeper
Japanese auxiliary minesweeper Showa Maru No. 8, World War II-era Japanese auxiliary minesweeper